Help! is the second studio album by American nu metal band Sylar. It was released on August 26, 2016 through Hopeless Records. The first single "Assume" was released on June 7, 2016 along with the pre-order for the album. This record was the last release to feature founding member Thomas Veroutis on drums before his departure in 2017.

Track listing

Personnel
Sylar 
 Jayden Panesso – lead vocals
 Miguel Cardona – rhythm guitar, clean vocals
 Dustin Jennings – lead guitar
 Travis Hufton – bass
 Thomas Veroutis – drums, percussion

Production
 Erik Ron – production, recording, mixing, mastering

Charts

References

2016 albums
Sylar (band) albums
Hopeless Records albums
Albums produced by Erik Ron